The Family School at Larkhall was a small, alternative school, based in South London, UK, founded by Polly Griffiths in 2007/8 to offer a Democratic education model to primary age children. The school closed in December 2012.

The Family School was in the Free Schools tradition, with no set curriculum, working on the basis that children are natural learners.

The school was a charity, "reluctantly fee-paying", to quote its literature.

History
Polly Griffiths and Dil Green, the founders of the school, worked to develop their ideas over two years with two other families and with Colin Hill, a teacher who had worked at Community and Voluntary Education in South London.

The Family School was founded in September 2008. For the first two years of its operation, families were officially home educators, as the school was not registered with Ofsted. After registering the school as an Independent School with DfE in September 2010, the school was inspected for the first time by Ofsted in June 2012 and was judged "Good" with "Outstanding" aspects. The small number of pupils attending made the school's financial viability increasingly difficult and therefore the school is currently temporarily closed pending re-opening on its new larger site in West Norwood.

Site
The school was in premises in Brixton, but the Trustees have acquired a site in West Norwood which will provide its long-term home.

Curriculum
The school had no set curriculum, and offered few formal lessons. Each pupil's journey through the school constituted the curriculum they followed. However, the school considered that certain skills and abilities were important to enable full participation in society, and these were incorporated into the school environment.

References

External links
Family School website
Sustainable Education
BBC |Radio 4 Learning Curve
 Ofsted Inspection Report June 2012
 Article about purchase of new site - West Norwood newsletter
 Article about progress on site: West Norwood newsletter

Defunct schools in the London Borough of Lambeth
Educational institutions established in 2007
2007 establishments in England
2007 in London
Educational institutions disestablished in 2012
2012 disestablishments in England
Democratic free schools